Montigny-Lengrain is a commune in the Aisne department in Hauts-de-France in northern France.

Population

History 
On Easter day 1945, the castle of Montigny-Lengrain, guarded by the faithful of King Louis IV of France, was taken by Herbert III of Vermandois, assisted by the Count of Tours and Blois Thibaud. The latter, vassal of Hugues the Great, participates in it as indirect support of Hugues to the fight against the king. (Y Sassier, Hugues Capet, Paris, Fayard, 2008, p115.)

Places and Monuments 
 Church of Saint-Martin de Montigny-Lengrain, historical monument since 1921.
 The Renaissance cross within the walls of the church, become with the church historical monument
 The monument to the dead.
 Road crosses.

See also
 Communes of the Aisne department

References

Montignylengrain
Suessiones
Aisne communes articles needing translation from French Wikipedia